Abdirov is a central Asian masculine surname, its feminine counterpart is Abdirova. Notable people with the surname include:

Charjou Abdirov (1933–1997), Uzbek microbiologist
Nurken Abdirov (1919–1942), Kazakh pilot 

Russian-language surnames